Lego DC Comics Super Heroes: Justice League – Attack of the Legion of Doom is a 2015 American computer-animated superhero comedy film based on the Lego and DC Comics brands, which was released on August 25, 2015 on Blu-ray, DVD and Digital HD. This is the fourth Lego DC Comics film following Lego Batman: The Movie – DC Super Heroes Unite, Lego DC Comics: Batman Be-Leaguered and Lego DC Comics Super Heroes: Justice League vs. Bizarro League.

Actors from various (also copyrighted) DC properties reprise their respective roles, including Mark Hamill as The Trickster, Nolan North as Superman, Khary Payton as Cyborg, John DiMaggio as The Joker, Josh Keaton as Green Lantern, Kevin Michael Richardson as Black Manta, Grey Griffin as Wonder Woman and Tom Kenny as The Penguin. The film received generally positive reviews, with praise for the animation, action, and humor, although some criticized the consumerism in the film.

Synopsis

After the Justice League's time stopping criminals, three supervillains, Lex Luthor, Sinestro, and Black Manta discuss (while sulking) what they have learned about this team of heroes. Then, Lex suggests they should band together and form a team of their own (which he dubs "The Legion of Doom"). Meanwhile, Darkseid is shown to have defeated the Justice League with Cyborg being the sole exception. Cyborg manages to defeat Darkseid and save the League. Unfortunately, this turns out to be a dream Cyborg was having. Cyborg wakes up just in time for the elections for the leader of the Justice League (which is announced by Superman). Batman wins the election, 3–1, Cyborg; Batman; and Superman voting for him. Superman gets one vote from Wonder Woman—Green Lantern and Flash writing her in.

Somewhere in a swamp, Lex Luthor, Sinestro, and Black Manta hold up an audition by using an obstacle course to determine who will get to join the Legion of Doom; the contestants consists of Joker, Man-Bat, Penguin, Cheetah, Captain Cold, Gorilla Grodd, Deathstroke, and Giganta. Giganta is rejected for her massive size; Deathstroke is rejected for literally destroying the course as well as Lex overhearing Sinestro and Black Manta commenting that Deathstroke should lead the Legion of Doom; and Joker, Penguin, and Man-Bat are rejected because the property that the Hall of Doom is on doesn't have enough parking spaces.

After triggering a stink bomb in a recent battle with Trickster, Cyborg begins to doubt his worth on the Justice League, who is forced to wear new outfits as a result to the bomb's detonation. Quickly, the Justice League becomes aware of the Legion of Doom and their plans to rob Area 52 (described by Luthor as the New 52 created to replace the old Area 51). The Justice League battles the Legion of Doom. Darkseid manages to use a Father Box to teleport Lex into a vault containing what he was after. The Legion of Doom escapes with a cell containing a specific alien prisoner. After opening it, the alien inmate is revealed to be a Martian named J'onn J'onnz who Lex plans to use against the Justice League. He tells J'onn that the Legion of Doom are heroes and the Justice League is evil.

Back at the Hall of Justice, Cyborg begins to question what he should do to be a better member. After a misconception from Wonder Woman, Cyborg gives himself excessive weapons. As he walks along the Hall of Justice, he appears to notice two Batmen. As it turns out, one of them was J'onn who hacks the Hall of Justice computer to create a false mission alert about the Metropolis power station where its prototype Nuketron reactor core preparing for destruction.

When the Justice League arrive at the power station, Cyborg sees that the station seems perfectly safe while the rest of the League can see the danger. This is because J'onn used his telepathy to make the fake mission alert look as real as possible as they evacuate Lois Lane and the workers alongside stopping other "problems" to the power plant. After the League launch the Nuketron reactor core into space, they immediately realize the only damage present is the damage they caused and the public turns against them for destroying the power station. The United Nations tribunal and General Sam Lane sentence the Justice League to be banished into space.

This, however, turns out to be Lex's plan all along and the Legion of Doom then begin to divide which parts of the world they will control. This results in J'onn questioning the affiliation of the Legion of Doom. While disguised as Black Manta, he soon finds out that Lex plans to dispose of him once his usefulness expires. In space, Sinestro uses the Father Box to send the Justice League to a black hole and Cyborg is destroyed in the process. Batman realizes that it wasn't Cyborg, but rather Cyborg's robot assistant Cy-Bot.

The real Cyborg is still in the Hall of Justice trying to find out why the Justice League saw the power station in danger while he didn't. He soon finds the microchip J'onn used to hack the computer, but Sinestro finds Cyborg and battles him. Just when it seems like Sinestro gained the upper hand, J'onn arrives and uses his telepathy to control him. J'onn explains how the Legion tricked him and how he tricked the Justice League into turning themselves against the public and that his telepathy was ineffective on inorganic beings, explaining why it didn't work on Cyborg, whose brain was half-machine. J'onn sides with Cyborg and has Sinestro bring back the rest of the Justice League.

As the Legion of Doom attacks the city, the Justice League split up to battle them one by one. The Legion of Doom is defeated and the Justice League are cleared of all charges. J'onn apologizes for deceiving the Justice League, but he is quickly forgiven and offered membership for the work as a true hero he performed with the Justice League. He gladly accepts and adopts the name "Martian Manhunter" after a compliment from Cyborg. When Sam Lane objects to the Justice League being forgiven for what they were tricked into doing, Martian Manhunter mind-controls Sam Lane to dance to the music that was playing.

Meanwhile, in prison, Lex tries to get Darkseid to break him out of prison. Darkseid refuses due to Lex's failure. As soon as he hangs up on Lex, Darkseid decides that if he wants to conquer the Earth, he will need help from an otherworldly being.

Cast
 Khary Payton as Victor Stone / Cyborg, Cy-Bot
 Troy Baker as Bruce Wayne / Batman
 Dee Bradley Baker as J'onn J'onzz / John Jones / Martian Manhunter, Man-Bat
 John DiMaggio as Lex Luthor, Joker
 Grey Griffin as Diana Prince / Wonder Woman, Lois Lane
 Mark Hamill as Trickster, Sinestro
 Josh Keaton as Hal Jordan / Green Lantern
 Tom Kenny as Penguin
 Nolan North as Kal-El / Clark Kent / Superman
 Kevin Michael Richardson as Captain Cold, Gorilla Grodd, Black Manta
 Cree Summer as Cheetah
 James Arnold Taylor as Barry Allen / Flash, General Sam Lane
 Tony Todd as Uxas / Darkseid

Commercial performance 
With DVD and Blu-ray sales combined, the film grossed $2.6 million.

References

External links
 

2015 direct-to-video films
2015 animated films
Animated Justice League films
2015 computer-animated films
Films about sentient toys
2010s superhero comedy films
Animated films based on video games
2010s American animated films
2010s direct-to-video animated superhero films
Attack of the Legion of Doom
Films directed by Rick Morales
2010s English-language films